Light anti-tank weapon or Light anti-armor weapon may refer to:

 a weapon in anti-tank warfare
LAW 80 / LAW 94, British single-use anti-tank projectile system
M72 LAW, American single-use anti-tank projectile system
NLAW / MBT-LAW, Swedish single-use anti-tank missile system